Alban Maria Johannes Berg (9 February 1885 – 24 December 1935) was an Austrian composer of the Second Viennese School. His compositional style combined Romantic lyricism with the twelve-tone technique. Although he left a relatively small oeuvre, he is remembered as one of the most important composers of the 20th century for his expressive style encompassing "entire worlds of emotion and structure".

Berg was born and lived in Vienna. He began to compose only at the age of fifteen. He studied counterpoint, music theory and harmony with Arnold Schoenberg between 1904 and 1911, and adopted his principles of developing variation and the twelve-tone technique. Berg's major works include the operas Wozzeck (1924) and Lulu (1935, finished posthumously), the chamber pieces Lyric Suite and Chamber Concerto, as well as a Violin Concerto. He also composed a number of songs (lieder). He is said to have brought more "human values" to the twelve-tone system, his works seen as more "emotional" than Schoenberg's. His music had a surface glamour that won him admirers when Schoenberg himself had few.

Berg died from sepsis in 1935.

Life and career

Early life
Berg was born in Vienna, the third of four children of Johanna and Konrad Berg. His father ran a successful export business, and the family owned several estates in Vienna and the countryside. The family's financial situation turned to the worse after the death of Konrad Berg in 1900, and it particularly affected young Berg, who had to repeat both his sixth and seventh grade to pass the exams. Berg was more interested in literature than music as a child and did not begin to compose until he was fifteen, when he started to teach himself music. With Marie Scheuchl, a maid in the family estate of Berghof in Carinthia and fifteen years his senior, he fathered a daughter, Albine, born 4 December 1902.

Berg had little formal music education before he became a student of Arnold Schoenberg in October 1904. With Schoenberg, he studied counterpoint, music theory, and harmony. By 1906 he was studying music full-time; by 1907 he began composition lessons. His student compositions included five drafts for piano sonatas. He also wrote songs, including his Seven Early Songs (Sieben frühe Lieder), three of which were Berg's first publicly performed work in a concert that featured the music of Schoenberg's pupils in Vienna that year.

The early sketches eventually culminated in Piano Sonata, Op. 1 (1907–1908); it is one of the most formidable "first" works ever written. Berg studied with Schoenberg for six years until 1911. Among Schoenberg's teaching was the idea that the unity of a musical composition depends upon all its aspects being derived from a single basic idea; this idea was later known as developing variation. Berg passed this on to his students, one of whom, Theodor W. Adorno, stated: "The main principle he conveyed was that of variation: everything was supposed to develop out of something else and yet be intrinsically different". The Piano Sonata is an example—the whole composition is derived from the work's opening quartal gesture and its opening phrase.

Innovation
Berg was a part of Vienna's cultural elite during the heady fin de siècle period. His circle included the musicians Alexander von Zemlinsky and Franz Schreker, the painter Gustav Klimt, the writer and satirist Karl Kraus, the architect Adolf Loos, and the poet Peter Altenberg.

In 1906 Berg met the singer  (1885–1976), daughter of a wealthy family (rumoured to be in fact the illegitimate daughter of Emperor Franz Joseph I from his liaison with Anna Nahowski). Despite the outward hostility of her family, the couple married on 3 May 1911.

In 1913 two of Berg's Altenberg Lieder (1912) were premièred in Vienna, conducted by Schoenberg in the infamous Skandalkonzert. Settings of aphoristic poetic utterances, the songs are accompanied by a very large orchestra. The performance caused a riot, and had to be halted. Berg effectively withdrew the work, and it was not performed in full until 1952. The full score remained unpublished until 1966.

From 1915 to 1918 Berg served in the Austro-Hungarian Army. During a period of leave in 1917 he accelerated work on his first opera, Wozzeck. After the end of World War I, he settled again in Vienna, where he taught private pupils. He also helped Schoenberg run his Society for Private Musical Performances, which sought to create the ideal environment for the exploration and appreciation of unfamiliar new music by means of open rehearsals, repeat performances, and the exclusion of professional critics.

Berg had a particular interest in the number 23, using it to structure several works.  Various suggestions have been made as to the reason for this interest: that he took it from the biorhythms theory of Wilhelm Fliess, in which a 23-day cycle is considered significant, or because he first suffered an asthma attack on the 23rd of the month.

Success of Wozzeck and inception of Lulu (1924–29)
In 1924 three excerpts from Wozzeck were performed, which brought Berg his first public success. The opera, which Berg completed in 1922, was first performed on 14 December 1925, when Erich Kleiber conducted the first performance in Berlin. Today, Wozzeck is seen as one of the century's most important works. Berg made a start on his second opera, the three-act Lulu, in 1928 but interrupted the work in 1929 for the concert aria Der Wein which he completed that summer. Der Wein presaged Lulu in a number of ways, including vocal style, orchestration, design and text.

Other well-known Berg compositions include the Lyric Suite (1926), which was later shown to employ elaborate cyphers to document a secret love affair; the post-Mahlerian Three Pieces for Orchestra (completed in 1915 but not performed until after Wozzeck); and the Chamber Concerto (Kammerkonzert, 1923–25) for violin, piano, and 13 wind instruments: this latter is written so conscientiously that Pierre Boulez has called it "Berg's strictest composition" and it, too, is permeated by cyphers and posthumously disclosed hidden programs. It was at this time he began exhibiting tone clusters in his works after meeting with American avant-garde composer Henry Cowell, whom he would eventually form a lifelong friendship with.

Final years (1930–35)

Life for the musical world was becoming increasingly difficult in the 1930s both in Vienna and Germany due to the rising tide of antisemitism and the Nazi cultural ideology that denounced modernity. Even to have an association with someone who was Jewish could lead to denunciation, and Berg's "crime" was to have studied with the Jewish composer Arnold Schoenberg. Berg found that opportunities for his work to be performed in Germany were becoming rare, and eventually his music was proscribed and placed on the list of degenerate music.

In 1932 Berg and his wife acquired an isolated lodge, the Waldhaus on the southern shore of the Wörthersee, near Schiefling am See in Carinthia, where he was able to work in seclusion, mainly on Lulu and the Violin Concerto. At the end of 1934, Berg became involved in the political intrigues around finding a replacement for Clemens Krauss as director of the Vienna State Opera.

As more of the performances of his work in Germany were cancelled by the Nazis, who had come to power in early 1933, he needed to ensure the new director would be an advocate for modernist music. Originally, the premiere of Lulu had been planned for the Berlin State Opera, where Erich Kleiber continued to champion his music and had conducted the premiere of Wozzeck in 1925, but now this was looking increasingly uncertain, and Lulu was rejected by the Berlin authorities in the spring of 1934. Kleiber's production of the Lulu symphonic suite on 30 November 1934 in Berlin was also the occasion of his resignation in protest at the extent of conflation of culture with politics. Even in Vienna, the opportunities for the Vienna School of musicians was dwindling.

Berg had interrupted the orchestration of Lulu because of an unexpected (and financially much-needed) commission from the Russian-American violinist Louis Krasner for a Violin Concerto (1935). This profoundly elegiac work, composed at unaccustomed speed and posthumously premiered, has become Berg's best-known and most-beloved composition. Like much of his mature work, it employs an idiosyncratic adaptation of Schoenberg's "dodecaphonic" or twelve-tone technique, that enables the composer to produce passages openly evoking tonality, including quotations from historical tonal music, such as a Bach chorale and a Carinthian folk song. The Violin Concerto was dedicated "to the memory of an Angel", Manon Gropius, the deceased daughter of architect Walter Gropius and Alma Mahler.

Death
Berg died aged 50 in Vienna, on Christmas Eve 1935, from blood poisoning apparently caused by a furuncle on his back, induced by an insect sting that occurred in November. He was buried at the Hietzing Cemetery in Vienna.

Before he died, Berg had completed the orchestration of only the first two of the three acts of Lulu. The completed acts were successfully premièred in Zürich in 1937. For personal reasons Helene Berg subsequently imposed a ban on any attempt to "complete" the final act, which Berg had in fact completed in short score. An orchestration was therefore commissioned in secret from Friedrich Cerha and premièred in Paris (under Pierre Boulez) only in 1979, soon after Helene Berg's own death.

Legacy

Berg is remembered as one of the most important composers of the 20th century and the most widely performed opera composer among the Second Viennese School. He is said to have brought more "human values" to the twelve-tone system, his works seen as more "emotional" than Schoenberg's. Critically, he is seen as having preserved the Viennese tradition in his music.

Berg scholar Douglas Jarman writes in the New Grove Dictionary of Music and Musicians that "[as] the 20th century closed, the 'backward-looking' Berg suddenly came as [George] Perle remarked, to look like its most forward-looking composer."

Alban Berg Quartett was a string quartet named after him, active from 1971 until 2008.

The asteroid 4528 Berg is named after him (1983).

The Alban Berg Monument, situated next to Vienna State Opera, was unveiled in 2016.

Major compositions

Piano
Piano Sonata, Op. 1

Chamber
String Quartet, Op. 3
Four Pieces for Clarinet and Piano, Op. 5
Lyric Suite, string quartet
Chamber Concerto (1925) for piano, violin and 13 wind instruments

Orchestral
Three Pieces for Orchestra, Op. 6
Violin Concerto

Vocal
Seven Early Songs
Vier Lieder (Four Songs), Op. 2
Five Orchestral Songs on Postcard Texts of Peter Altenberg, Op. 4
Der Wein
Schliesse mir die Augen beide

Operas
Wozzeck, Op. 7 (1925)
Lulu  (1937)

References

Citations

Sources

Further reading

 Adorno, Theodor W. Alban Berg: Master of the Smallest Link. Trans. Juliane Brand and Christopher Hailey. New York: Cambridge University Press, 1991.
 Brand, Juliane, Christopher Hailey and Donald Harris, eds. The Berg-Schoenberg Correspondence: Selected Letters. New York: Norton, 1987.
 Bruhn, Siglind, ed. Encrypted Messages in Alban Berg’s Music. New York: Garland Publishing, 1998.
 Carner, Mosco. Alban Berg: The Man and the Work. London: Duckworth, 1975.
 dos Santos, Silvio J. Narratives of Identity in Alban Berg's 'Lulu'''. Rochester, New York: University of Rochester Press, 2014.
 Floros, Constantin. Trans. by Ernest Bernhardt-Kabisch. Alban Berg and Hanna Fuchs . Bloomington: Indiana University Press, 2007.
 Grun, Bernard, ed. Alban Berg: Letters to his Wife. London: Faber and Faber, 1971.
 Headlam, Dave. The Music of Alban Berg. New Haven: Yale University Press, 1996.
Jarman, Douglas. "Dr. Schon's Five-Strophe Aria: Some Notes on Tonality and Pitch Association in Berg's Lulu". Perspectives of New Music 8/2 (Spring/Summer 1970).
Jarman, Douglas. "Some Rhythmic and Metric Techniques in Alban Berg's Lulu". The Musical Quarterly 56/3 (July 1970).
Jarman, Douglas. "Lulu: The Sketches". International Alban Berg Society Newsletter, 6 (June 1978).
Jarman, Douglas. "Countess Geschwitz's Series: A Controversy Resolved?". Proceedings of the Royal Musical Association 107 (1980/81).
Jarman, Douglas. "Some Observations on Rhythm, Meter and Tempo in Lulu". In Alban Berg Studien. Ed. Rudolf Klein. Vienna: Universal Edition, 1981.
Jarman, Douglas. "Lulu: The Musical and Dramatic Structure". Royal Opera House Covent Garden program notes, 1981.
Jarman, Douglas. "The 'Lost' Score of the 'Symphonic Pieces from Lulu". International Alban Berg Society Newsletter 12 (Fall/Winter 1982).
 
 Leibowitz, René. Schoenberg and his school; the contemporary stage of the language of music. Trans. Dika Newlin. New York: Philosophical Library, 1949.
 Monson, Karen. Alban Berg: A Biography. London: Macdonald and Jane's, 1979.
 Perle, George. The Operas of Alban Berg. Berkeley: University of California Press, 1980.
 Redlich, Hans Ferdinand. Alban Berg, the Man and His Music. London: John Calder, 1957.
 Reich, Willi. The life and work of Alban Berg. Trans. Cornelius Cardew. New York : Da Capo Press, 1982.
 Schmalfeldt, Janet. "Berg's Path to Atonality: The Piano Sonata, Op. 1". Alban Berg: Historical and Analytical Perspectives. Eds. David Gable and Robert P. Morgan, pp. 79–110. New York: Oxford University Press, 1991.
 Schweizer, Klaus. Die Sonatensatzform im Schaffen Alban Bergs. Stuttgart: Satz und Druck, 1970.
 
 
 
 Wilkey, Jay Weldon. Certain Aspects of Form in the Vocal Music of Alban Berg''. Ph.D. thesis. Ann Arbor: Indiana University, 1965.

External links

 
 Alban Berg biography and works on the UE website (publisher)
 Vocal texts used by Alban Berg with translations to various languages, LiederNet Archive
 
 Alban Berg at Pytheas Center for Contemporary Music
 albanberg.resampled.de The most comprehensive acoustic representation of Alban Bergs Works in digital realisations.
 Composer's entry on IRCAM's database

1885 births
1935 deaths
19th-century Austrian people
20th-century Austrian composers
20th-century Austrian musicians
20th-century Austrian male musicians
20th-century Austrian people
20th-century classical composers
Austrian classical composers
Austrian male classical composers
Austrian opera composers
Austro-Hungarian military personnel of World War I
Composers from Vienna
Deaths due to insect bites and stings
Deaths from sepsis
Expressionist music
Male opera composers
Pupils of Arnold Schoenberg
Second Viennese School
Twelve-tone and serial composers